Real Jazz is a Sirius XM Satellite Radio station devoted to traditional jazz, contemporary jazz and bebop music. It can be heard on XM channel 67 (previously it was on 70), Sirius channel 67 (previously 72) and Dish Network channel 6072.  Until February 9, 2010, it was heard on DirecTV channel 850.  The program director is Mark Ruffin; former PD Maxx Myrick is still heard as an on-air personality.

The channel bills itself as "Swinging from Coast to Coast". Real Jazz replaced the Sirius channel Pure Jazz.

Shows
 American Jazz with Dick Golden and Tony Bennett
 Manteca Latin Jazz
 Jazz for Young People with Wynton Marsalis
 The French Quarter
 The Blue Note Hour with Don Was
 Miller Time with Marcus Miller
 Beyond Jazz
 Organized with Joey DeFrancesco

References

External links
SiriusXM: Real Jazz

Sirius Satellite Radio channels
XM Satellite Radio channels
Sirius XM Radio channels
Jazz radio stations in the United States
Radio stations established in 2001